Swimming at the 2017 Summer Deaflympics in Samsun, Turkey took place at Atakum Olympic Swimming Pool.'''

Medal summary

Medalists
* Indicates the athlete only competed in the preliminary heats and received medals.

Men

Women

Mixed

References

External links
 Swimming

2017 Summer Deaflympics